Nitocri is an opera (melodramma serio) in two acts composed by Saverio Mercadante to libretto by Apostolo Zeno adapted by Lodovico Piossasco Feys. The libretto is a fictionalised account of the Egyptian queen Nitocris. The opera premiered at the Teatro Regio in Turin on 26 December 1824.

Background and performance history
According to Francesco Florimo, the opera was "well received" at its premiere. A second revised version was performed at the Teatro della Canobbiana in Milan on 2 October 1830 with newly designed sets by Alessandro Sanquirico.

Although the opera fell into oblivion, Mirteo's aria "Se m'abbandoni", sung at the premiere by  en travesti, became a popular concert piece for contraltos and mezzo-sopranos and was sometimes interpolated into other operas, notably by Maria Malibran in the final scene of Zingarelli's Giulietta e Romeo.

Roles

Recordings
There are no complete recordings of the opera. However, the overture was recorded by the Orchestra Sinfonica Moldova for Mercadante: Sinfonie da Opere (Bongiovanni GB2144), and Mirteo's aria "Se m'abbandoni" sung by Della Jones appears on A Hundred Years of Italian Opera 1820–1830 (Opera Rara ORCH104)

References

External links

Complete libretto for the 1824 premiere at the Teatro Regio di Torino 
Complete libretto for the 1830 performance at the Teatro della Canobbiana 

Operas by Saverio Mercadante
Italian-language operas
1824 operas
Operas
Operas set in ancient Egypt